Shame, Humility, Revenge is the second studio album by Skin, released in 1988 by Product Inc.

Track listing

Personnel
Adapted from the Shame, Humility, Revenge liner notes.

Musicians
 Michael Gira – lead vocals, acoustic guitar, keyboards, piano, effects, musical arrangement, production
 Jarboe – backing vocals, keyboards, piano
 Additional musicians
 Gini Ball – violin (A3)
 Kadir Durvesh – Indian oboe (A2, A4)
 Martin McCarrick – cello (A3)
 Billy McGee – double bass (A3), musical arrangement, (A3)
 Chris Pitzaladi – viola (A3)
 Chris Tombling – violin (A3)

Production and additional personnel
 Roop Caulson – engineering
 Ian Cooper – mastering
 Skin – design
 Monica Curtin – photography
 John Fryer – engineering
 Paul Kendall – engineering, programming
 Dave Powell – engineering

Release history

References

External links 
 

1988 albums
Albums produced by Michael Gira